The British Pacific Fleet (BPF) was a Royal Navy formation that saw action against Japan during the Second World War. The fleet was composed of empire naval vessels. The BPF formally came into being on 22 November 1944 from the remaining ships of the former Eastern Fleet then being re-named the East Indies Fleet and continuing to be based in Trincomalee. The British Pacific Fleet's main base was at Sydney, Australia, with a forward base at Manus Island in northern Papua New Guinea.  One of the largest fleets ever assembled by the Royal Navy, by Victory over Japan Day (VJ Day) it consisted of over two hundred ships and submarines and more than 750 aircraft; including four battleships and six fleet aircraft carriers, fifteen smaller aircraft carriers, eleven cruisers and numerous smaller warships, submarines, and support vessels. The fleet took part in the Battle of Okinawa and the final naval strikes on Japan.

Background
Following their retreat to the western side of the Indian Ocean in 1942, British naval forces did not return to the South West Pacific theatre until 17 May 1944, when an Anglo-American carrier task force implemented Operation Transom, a joint raid on Surabaya, Java.

The US was liberating British territories in the Pacific and extending its influence. It was therefore seen as a political and military imperative by the British Government to restore a British presence in the region and to deploy British forces against Japan. The British Government was determined that British territories, such as Hong Kong, should be recaptured by British forces.

The British Government was not initially unanimous on the commitment of the BPF. Churchill, in particular, argued against it, not wishing to be a visibly junior partner in what had been exclusively the United States' battle. He also considered that a British presence would be unwelcome and should be concentrated on Burma and Malaya. Naval planners, supported by the Chiefs of Staff, believed that such a commitment would strengthen British influence and the British Chiefs of Staff considered mass resignation, so strongly held were their opinions.

The Admiralty had proposed a British role in the Pacific in early 1944 but the initial USN response had been discouraging. Admiral Ernest King, Commander-in-Chief United States Fleet and Chief of Naval Operations, was reluctant to concede any such role and raised a number of objections, and insisted that the BPF should be self-sufficient. These were eventually overcome or discounted and at a meeting, US President Franklin D. Roosevelt "intervened to say that the British Fleet was no sooner offered than accepted. In this, though the fact was not mentioned, he overruled Admiral King's opinion."

The Australian Government had sought US military assistance in 1942, when it was faced with the possibility of Japanese invasion. While Australia had made a significant contribution to the Pacific War, it had never been an equal partner with its US counterparts in strategy. It was argued that a British presence would act as a counterbalance to the powerful and increasing US presence in the Pacific.

Constituent forces
The fleet was founded when Admiral Sir Bruce Fraser struck his flag at Trincomalee as Commander-in-Chief of the British Eastern Fleet and hoisted it in the gunboat  as Commander-in-Chief British Pacific Fleet. He later transferred his flag to a more suitable vessel, the battleship .

The Eastern Fleet was based in Ceylon (now Sri Lanka), and reorganised into the British East Indies Fleet, subsequently becoming the British Pacific Fleet (BPF). The BPF operated against targets in Sumatra, gaining experience until early 1945, when it departed Trincomalee for Sydney. (These operations are described in the article on the British Eastern Fleet.)

The Royal Navy provided the majority of the fleet's vessels and all the capital ships but elements and personnel included contributions from the Royal Fleet Auxiliary (RFA), as well as the Commonwealth nations, including the Royal Australian Navy (RAN), Royal Canadian Navy (RCN) and Royal New Zealand Navy (RNZN). With its larger vessels integrated with United States Navy (USN) formations since 1942, the RAN's contribution was limited. A high proportion of naval aviators were New Zealanders and Canadians. The USN also contributed to the BPF, as did personnel from the South African Navy (SAN). Port facilities in Australia and New Zealand also made vital contributions in support of the British Pacific Fleet.

During World War II, the fleet was commanded by Admiral Sir Bruce Fraser. In practice, command of the fleet in action devolved to Vice-Admiral Sir Bernard Rawlings, with Vice-Admiral Sir Philip Vian in charge of air operations by the Royal Navy's Fleet Air Arm (FAA). The fighting end of the fleet was referred to as Task Force 37 or 57 and the Fleet Train was Task Force 113. The 1st Aircraft Carrier Squadron was the lead carrier formation.

No. 300 Wing RAF was established in Australia in late 1944 to fly transport aircraft in support of the BPF, and came under the direct command of Fraser. The wing was expanded to a group in 1945 and conducted regular flights from Sydney to the fleet's forward bases.

Supply

The requirement that the BPF be self-sufficient meant the establishment of a fleet train that could support a naval force at sea for weeks or months. The Royal Navy had been accustomed to operating close to its bases in Britain, the Mediterranean and the Indian Ocean. Infrastructure and expertise were lacking in the Pacific rim. In the north Atlantic and Mediterranean, the high risk of submarine and air attack precluded routine refuelling at sea. Fortunately for the BPF "the American logistics authorities... interpreted self-sufficiency in a very liberal sense." American officers told Rear Admiral Douglas Fisher, commander of the British Fleet Train, that he could have anything and everything "that could be given without Admiral King's knowledge."

The Admiralty sent Vice Admiral Charles Daniel to the United States for consultation about the supply and administration of the fleet. He then proceeded to Australia where he became Vice Admiral, Administration, British Pacific Fleet, a role that "if unspectacular compared with command of a fighting squadron, was certainly one of the most arduous to be allocated to a British Flag officer during the entire war." The US Pacific Fleet had assembled an enormous fleet of oilers and supply ships of every type. Even before the war, it had been active in the development of underway replenishment techniques.

In February 1944 the Admiralty estimated that the Fleet Train would require 134 merchant ships, of about 1½ million gross tons. As only 20 ships could be provided "in due course" the remainder would have to come from: the United States, the Admiralty's resources (although only a "handful" of its 560 merchant ships were actually available), or the general pool of merchant shipping (on which there were "many demands"). And the Admiralty requirements increased from 80 ships (totalling 590,000 tons) in January to 134 then by the end of March to 158. The Prime Minister had been alarmed for the original requirements for 80 ships, and on 9 April he issued a minute defining the limits of the Fleet Train based on a minimum of 24 million tons of imports "this year". He referred to the Navy getting 230,000 tons of new merchant shipping in about a year. The minute referred to operations "in the Indian ocean or in the South-West Pacific", reflecting his own preference for Operation Culverin against northern Sumatra and Malaya rather than the "Middle Strategy".

The Admiralty realised that it needed a great deal of new equipment and training, in a short time and with whatever it had to hand. Lacking specialist ships, it had to improvise a fleet train from RN, RFA and merchant ships. On 8 February 1944, the First Sea Lord, Admiral of the Fleet Sir Andrew Cunningham, informed the Defence Committee that 91 ships would be required to support the BPF. This was based on an assumption that the BPF would be active off the Philippines or would have a base there. By March, the war zone had moved north and the Americans were unwilling to allow the British to establish facilities in the Philippines. The estimate had grown to 158 ships, as it was recognised that operations eventually would be fought close to Japan. This had to be balanced against the shipping needed to import food for the population of the UK. In January 1945, the War cabinet was forced to postpone the deployment of the fleet by two months due to the shortage of shipping.

The BPF found that its tankers were too few, too slow and in some cases unsuitable for the task of replenishment at sea. Its oiling gear, hoses and fittings were too often poorly designed. British ships refuelled at sea mostly by the over-the-stern method, a safer but less efficient technique compared with the American method of refuelling in parallel. Lack of proper equipment and insufficient practice meant burst hoses or excessive time at risk to submarine attack, while holding a constant course during fuelling. As the Royal Australian Navy had discovered, British-built ships had only about a third of the refrigeration space of a comparable American ship. They also suffered from limited fuel tankage and less efficient machinery, particularly the capital ships (A comparison of HMS King George V and USS Washington conducted in 1942 found the British ship burned 39 per cent more fuel at cruising speed and 20 per cent at high speed, giving her half the action radius.) British ships therefore required replenishment more frequently than American ships. In some cases even American-built equipment was not interchangeable, for FAA aircraft had been "Anglicized" by the installation of British radios and oxygen masks, while Vought Corsairs had their wing-folding arrangements modified to fit into the more cramped hangars of British carriers. Replacement aircraft therefore had to be brought from the UK.

The British Chiefs of Staff decided early on to base the BPF in Australia rather than India. While it was apparent that Australia, with its population of only about seven million could not support the projected 675,000 men and women of the BPF, the actual extent of the Australian contribution was undetermined. The Australian government agreed to contribute to the support of the BPF but the Australian economy was fully committed to the war effort and manpower and stores for the BPF could only come from taking them from American and Australian forces fighting the Japanese.

Unfortunately, Admiral Sir Bruce Fraser arrived in Sydney on 10 December 1944 under the mistaken impression that Australia had asked for the BPF and promised to provide for its needs. Two days later, the Acting Prime Minister of Australia Frank Forde announced the allocation of £21,156,500 for the maintenance of the BPF. In January 1945, General of the Army Douglas MacArthur agreed to release American stockpiles in Australia to support the BPF. The Australian government soon became concerned at the voracious demands of the BPF works programme, which was criticised by Australian military leaders. In April 1945, Fraser publicly criticised the Australian government's handling of waterside industrial disputes that were holding up British ships. The government was shocked and angered but agreed to allocate £6,562,500 for BPF naval works. Fraser was not satisfied. On 8 August 1945, Prime Minister of the United Kingdom Clement Attlee felt obliged to express his regret for the misunderstandings to the Australian government.

After bombarding the Sumatra oil refineries for Nimitz, the Fleet arrived in Australia on 4 February 1945; it comprised two battleships, four fleet carriers, three cruisers and accompanying destroyers. The Fleet Train comprised over 300,000 tons of shipping as built or converted since the beginning of 1944. In June 1945 the Fleet was to comprise four battleships, ten aircraft carriers, sixteen cruisers (including two from New Zealand and one from Canada), forty destroyers and about ninety escorts (including Canadian escorts).

The distance from Sydney was too far to allow efficient fleet support so with much American support, a forward base was established at Seeadler Harbor, Manus atoll, in the Admiralty Islands, which was described as "Scapa Flow with bloody palm trees". As well as its base at Sydney, the Fleet Air Arm established Mobile Naval Air Bases (MONABs) in Australia to provide supplies and technical support for the aircraft. The first of these became active in Sydney in January 1945.

Operations

Major actions in which the fleet was involved included Operation Meridian, air strikes in January 1945 against oil production at Palembang, Sumatra. These raids, conducted in bad weather, succeeded in reducing the oil supply of the Japanese Navy. A total of 48 FAA aircraft were lost due to enemy action and crash landings against claims of 30 Japanese aeroplanes destroyed in dogfights and 38 on the ground.

The United States Navy (USN), which had control of Allied operations in the Pacific Ocean Areas, gave the BPF combat units the name Task Force 57 (TF-57) when it joined Admiral Raymond Spruance's United States Fifth Fleet on 15 March 1945. On 27 May 1945, it became Task Force 37 (TF-37) when it became part of Admiral William Halsey's United States Third Fleet.

In March 1945, while supporting the invasion of Okinawa, the BPF had sole responsibility for operations in the Sakishima Islands. Its role was to suppress Japanese air activity, using gunfire and air attack, at potential kamikaze staging airfields that would otherwise be a threat to US Navy vessels operating at Okinawa. The British fleet carriers with their armoured flight decks were subject to heavy and repeated kamikaze attacks, but they proved highly resistant, and returned to action relatively quickly. The USN liaison officer on  commented: "When a kamikaze hits a US carrier it means 6 months of repair at Pearl [Harbor]. When a kamikaze hits a Limey carrier it's just a case of 'Sweepers, man your brooms'."

Fleet Air Arm Supermarine Seafires saw service in the Pacific campaigns. Due to their good high altitude performance, short range and lack of ordnance-carrying capabilities (compared to the Hellcats and Corsairs of the Fleet) the Seafires were allocated the vital defensive duties of combat air patrol (CAP) over the fleet. Seafires were vital in countering the kamikaze attacks during the Iwo Jima landings and beyond. The Seafires' best day was 15 August 1945, shooting down eight attacking aircraft for one loss.

In April 1945, the British 4th Submarine Flotilla was transferred to the big Allied submarine base at Fremantle, Western Australia, as part of the BPF. On 31 July 1945, in Operation Struggle, the British midget submarine XE3, crewed by Lieutenant Ian Fraser, Acting Leading Seaman James Magennis, Sub-Lieutenant William James Lanyon Smith, RNZNVR and Engine Room Artificer Third Class, Charles Alfred Reed, attacked Japanese shipping at Singapore. They seriously damaged the heavy cruiser , while docked at her berth at Selatar Naval Base. Fraser and Magennis were awarded the Victoria Cross, Smith received the Distinguished Service Order (DSO) and Reed the Conspicuous Gallantry Medal (CGM).

Battleships and aircraft from the fleet also participated in the Allied naval bombardments on Japanese home islands. For the assaults on Japan, the British commanders accepted the BPF should become a component element of the US 3rd Fleet, commanded by Admiral William Halsey. Battleship  bombarded Hitachi, about 80 mi (130 km) northeast of Tokyo, and Hamamatsu, near Toyohashi. This was the last time a British battleship fired in action; the US fleet commander, William Halsey, excluded British forces from the bombing of Kure naval base. Halsey wrote in his memoirs: "it was imperative that we forestall a possible postwar claim by Britain that she had delivered even a part of the final blow that demolished the Japanese fleet.... an exclusively American attack was therefore in American interests". Carrier strikes by British naval aircraft were carried out against land and harbour targets during the attacks on Kure and the Inland Sea, 24–28 July 1945. Naval aircraft attacked the port of Osaka, airfields, and, notably, sank Japanese escort carrier Shimane Maru and disabled the Kaiyō. Two escort ships and several smaller vessels were also sunk.

The BPF would have played a major part in a proposed invasion of the Japanese home islands, known as Operation Downfall, which was cancelled after Japan surrendered. The last naval air action in World War II was on VJ-Day when British carrier aircraft shot down Japanese Zero fighters.

Allied co-operation
The conflicting British and American political objectives have been mentioned: Britain needed to "show the flag" in an effective way while the US wished to demonstrate, beyond question, its own pre-eminence in the Pacific. In practice, there were cordial relations between the fighting fleets and their sea commanders. Although Admiral King had stipulated that the BPF should be wholly self-sufficient, in practice, material assistance was freely given.

Order of battle

Ships

The fleet included 6 fleet carriers, 4 light carriers, 2 aircraft maintenance carriers and 9 escort carriers, with a total of more than 750 aircraft, 4 battleships, 11 cruisers, 35 destroyers, 14 frigates, 44 smaller warships, 31 submarines, and 54 large vessels in the fleet train.

Fleet carriers
 : approximate airgroup 36 Corsairs, 15 Avengers (Flagship 1st Aircraft Carrier Squadron)
 : approximate airgroup 36 Corsairs, 15 Avengers
 : 48 Seafire, 21 Avenger, 12 Firefly
 : 40 Seafire, 18 Avenger, 12 Firefly
 : 39 Hellcats, 21 Avengers
 : 36 Corsairs, 15 Avengers, plus Walrus amphibian

Light carriers
 : 24 Corsairs, 18 Barracudas
 : 21 Corsairs, 18 Barracudas
 : 21 Corsairs, 18 Barracudas
 : 24 Corsairs, 18 Barracudas

Maintenance carriers
 
 

Escort carriers
 Striker (flag ship 30th Aircraft Carrier Squadron)
 
 
 
 Ruler
 Reaper
 Slinger
 Speaker
 Vindex

Battleships
  (Flagship 1st Battle Squadron)
 
 Duke of York arrived in July 1945
 Anson arrived in July 1945

Cruisers
 
 
 
 
 
 
 HMNZS Gambia
 
 
  (Flagship 4th Cruiser Squadron)
 

Cruiser-minelayers
 
 
 

AA Escort
 HMCS Prince Robert
Destroyers
 HMCS Algonquin
 Barfleur
 Grenville
 Kempenfelt
 HMAS Napier
 HMAS Nepal
 HMAS Nizam
 HMAS Norman
 Quadrant
 
 HMAS Queenborough
 HMAS Quiberon
 HMAS Quickmatch
 
 Tenacious
 Termagant
 Terpsichore
 Troubridge
 Tumult
 Tuscan
 Tyrian
 Ulster
 Ulysses
 Undaunted
 Undine
 Urania
 Urchin
 Ursa
 Wager
 Wakeful
 Wessex
 Whelp
 Whirlwind
 Wizard
 Wrangler

Frigates
 Aire
 Avon
 Barle
 Bigbury Bay
 Derg
 Findhorn
 Helford
 Odzani
 Parret
 Plym
 Usk
 Veryan Bay
 Whitesand Bay
 Widemouth Bay

Sloops
 Alacrity
 Amethyst
 Black Swan
 Crane
 Cygnet
 Enchantress
 Erne
 Flamingo
 Hart
 Hind
 Opossum
 Pheasant
 Redpole
 Starling
 Stork
 Whimbrel
 Woodcock
 Wren

Corvettes
 HMNZS Arbutus
 HMAS Ballarat
 HMAS Bendigo
 HMAS Burnie
 HMAS Cairns
 HMAS Cessnock
 HMAS Gawler
 HMAS Geraldton
 HMAS Goulburn
 HMAS Ipswich
 HMAS Kalgoorlie
 HMAS Launceston
 HMAS Lismore
 HMAS Maryborough
 HMAS Pirie
 HMAS Tamworth
 HMAS Toowoomba
 HMAS Whyalla
 HMAS Wollongong

Submarines
 Porpoise Minelayer
 Rorqual Minelayer
 Sanguine
 Scotsman
 Sea Devil
 Sea Nymph
 Sea Scout
 Selene
 Sidon
 Sleuth
 Solent
 Spark
 Spearhead
 Stubborn
 
 Supreme
 Taciturn
 Tapir
 Taurus
 Terrapin
 Thorough
 Thule
 Tiptoe
 Totem
 
 Trump
 Tudor
 Turpin
 Virtue Antisubmarine training
 Voracious Antisubmarine training
 Vox Antisubmarine training

Landing ships
 Glenearn – landing ship, infantry (Large)
 Lothian – landing ship, headquarters ship (Large)

Fleet train
 Adamant submarine depot ship
 Aorangi accommodation ship
 Artifex repair ship
 Assistance repair ship
 RFA Bacchus Distilling ship
 Bonaventure Submarine depot ship
 Berry Head Repair ship
 Deer Sound Repair ship
 Diligence Repair ship
 Dullisk Cove Repair ship
 SS Empire Clyde Hospital ship
 SS Empire Crest Water carrier
 Fernmore Boom carrier
 Flamborough Head Repair ship
 Fort Colville Aircraft store ship
 RFA Fort Langley Aircraft store ship
 HMHS Gerusalemme Hospital ship
 Guardian Netlayer
 HMNZS Kelantan Repair ship
 RFA King Salvor Salvage ship
 Lancashire Accommodation ship
 Leonian Boom carrier
 Maidstone Submarine depot ship
 NZHS Maunganui Hospital ship
 Montclare Destroyer Depot Ship
 HMHS Oxfordshire Hospital ship
 Resource Repair ship
 Salvestor Salvage ship
 Salvictor Salvage ship
 Shillay Danlayer
 Springdale Repair ship
 Stagpool Distilling ship
 RNH Tjitalengka Hospital ship
 Trodday Danlayer
 Tyne Destroyer Depot Ship
 Vacport Water carrier
 RNH Vasna Hospital ship

Replenishment oilers
 RFA Arndale
 RFA Bishopdale
 RFA Brown Ranger
 RFA Cederdale
 RFA Eaglesdale
 RFA Green Ranger
 RFA Olna
 RFA Rapidol
 RFA Serbol
 RFA Wave Emperor
 RFA Wave Governor
 RFA Wave King
 RFA Wave Monarch
 Aase Maersk
 Carelia
 Darst Creek
 Golden Meadow
 Iere
 Loma Nova
 San Adolpho
 San Amado
 San Ambrosia
 Seven Sisters

Store ships
 Bosporus
 City of Dieppe
 Corinda
 Darvel
 Edna
 Fort Alabama
 Fort Constantine Victualling stores ship
 Fort Dunvegan Victualling stores ship
 Fort Edmonton Victualling stores ship
 Fort Providence Naval stores ship
 Fort Wrangell Naval stores ship
 Gudrun Maersk
 Hermelin
 Heron
 Hickory Burn
 Hickory Dale
 Hickory Glen
 Hickory Steam
 Jaarstrom
 Kheti
 Kistna
 Kola
 Marudu
 Pacheco
 Prince de Liege
 Princess Maria Pia
 Prome
 Robert Maersk
 San Andres
 Sclesvig
 Thyra S

Source: Smith, Task Force 57, pp. 178–184

Fleet Air Arm Squadrons

See also
 Pacific Station
 United States Battleship Division Nine  – An analogous situation in World War I where a US Navy Battleship Division (BatDiv) operated with the Royal Navy's Grand Fleet during 1917-18.

References

Sources

Further reading

External links

 Fleet Air Arm Archive, 2000–01, British Pacific Fleet 1945
 Supplement to the London Gazette of Tuesday, the 1st of June, 1948, "The Contribution of the British Pacific Fleet to the Assault on Okinawa, 1945." (Published 2 June 1948.)
 The Official History of New Zealand in the Second World War 1939–1945 (1956), Ch. 24: "With the British Pacific Fleet" 
 "The Short but Brilliant Life of the British Pacific Fleet," Nicholas Sarantakes

Fleets of the Royal Navy
History of the Commonwealth of Nations
Naval history of Canada
Military units and formations of the Royal Navy in World War II
Military units and formations established in 1944
Military units and formations disestablished in 1945
1944 establishments in the United Kingdom
1945 disestablishments in the United Kingdom
Military history of the Pacific Ocean
British Commonwealth Occupation Force